The 1935 Stanley Cup Finals was contested by the Montreal Maroons and the Toronto Maple Leafs. The Maroons won the series 3–0 to win their second and final Stanley Cup. The Maroons are the last defunct team to ever win the Cup, as the team disbanded three years later, and were also the last non-Original Six team to win the championship until the Philadelphia Flyers in 1974.

Paths to the Finals

Toronto defeated the Boston Bruins in a best-of-five 3–1 to advance to the Finals.

The Maroons had to play a total-goals series; 1–0 against Chicago Black Hawks, and win a second two-game total-goals series 5–4 against the New York Rangers to advance to the Finals.

Game summaries
Maroons manager-coach Tommy Gorman became the only coach to win successive Stanley Cup titles with two different teams after winning with the Chicago Black Hawks in the 1934 Stanley Cup Finals.

It was the first all-Canadian final since the Maroons defeated Victoria in 1926, as well as the only Finals to feature two Canadian Division teams in the division's twelve years of existence. Maroons goaltender Alex Connell allowed just four goals in the three games.

Stanley Cup engraving
The 1935 Stanley Cup was presented to Maroons captain Hooley Smith by NHL President Frank Calder following the Maroons' 4–1 win over the Maple Leafs in game three.

The following Maroons players and staff had their names engraved on the Stanley Cup

1934–35 Montreal Maroons

See also
 1934–35 NHL season

References & notes

 Podnieks, Andrew; Hockey Hall of Fame (2004). Lord Stanley's Cup. Bolton, Ont.: Fenn Pub. pp 12, 50. 

Stanley Cup
Stanley Cup Finals
Toronto Maple Leafs games
Montreal Maroons
April 1935 sports events
Ice hockey competitions in Montreal
Ice hockey competitions in Toronto
1930s in Toronto
1930s in Montreal
1935 in Quebec
1935 in Ontario